The 2004–05 CERS Cup was the 25th season of the CERS Cup, Europe's second club roller hockey competition organized by CERH. 22 teams from five national associations qualified for the competition as a result of their respective national league placing in the previous season. Following a preliminary phase and four knockout rounds, Follonica won its first title.

Preliminary phase 

|}

Knockout stage

See also
2004–05 CERH European League

References

External links
 CERH website
 RinkHockey.net

World Skate Europe Cup
CERS Cup
CERS Cup